The Austrian Open was a pro–am snooker tournament held in Wels, Austria. The tournament was first held in 1992. The last champion was Mark Williams.

Winners

Notes

References

Snooker pro–am competitions
Recurring sporting events established in 1992
Recurring events disestablished in 2012
Sport in Upper Austria
1992 establishments in Austria
2012 disestablishments in Austria
Defunct sports competitions in Austria
Defunct snooker competitions
Snooker in Austria
Wels